Homola (Czech/Slovak feminine: Homolová) is a Czech and Slovak surname. The surname may refer to:

 Bedřich Homola (1887–1943), Czech general
 Bernard Homola (1894–1975), German film score composer
 Craig Homola (born 1958), American ice hockey player
 Irena Homola-Skąpska (1929–2017), Polish historian
 Jiří Homola (born 1980), Czech footballer
 Mária Homolová (born 1987), Slovak gymnast
 Matěj Homola (born 1973), Czech musician
 Maťo Homola (born 1994), Slovak racing driver

See also
 
 Homola barbata, species of crab

Czech-language surnames